Heinz "Heini" Jenni (July 25, 1951 - October 8, 1992) was a former Swiss professional ice hockey right winger who played for HC La Chaux-de-Fonds and EV Zug in the National League A. He also represented the Swiss national team at the 1972 Winter Olympics.

References

External links

1951 births
1992 deaths
EV Zug players
HC La Chaux-de-Fonds players
HC Lugano players
Ice hockey players at the 1972 Winter Olympics
Olympic ice hockey players of Switzerland
Swiss ice hockey right wingers
People from Thun
Sportspeople from the canton of Bern